Gary Charles Visconti (born May 10, 1945 in Detroit, Michigan) is an American former figure skater. He won the gold medal at the U.S. Figure Skating Championships twice and captured the bronze medal at the World Figure Skating Championships two times. He currently works as a coach.

Visconti is also a painter and has work on exhibit with  the Art of the Olympians (AOTO)

Results

References

Navigation

American male single skaters
Figure skaters at the 1968 Winter Olympics
Olympic figure skaters of the United States
American figure skating coaches
Living people
1945 births
World Figure Skating Championships medalists
Figure skaters from Detroit